Molgophis is an extinct genus of prehistoric amphibian.

See also
 Prehistoric amphibian
 List of prehistoric amphibians

References 
Carroll, R. L. et al. (1998) Encyclopedia of Paleoherpetology Part 1. München:Pfeil.

Lysorophians